Miscanthus fuscus, one of three species known as elephant grass, is a South Asian grass species first described by William Roxburgh, and was given its current name by George Bentham. Miscanthus fuscus is included in the genus silvergrasses, and the grass family. No subspecies are listed in the Catalogue of Life.

The bamboo-like plant grows rapidly up to 3 metres high, generating a high yield of biomass with low ash content, suitable for use in electricity generation.

References

fuscus
Grasses of Asia
Grasses of India
Flora of the Indian subcontinent
Biomass